The 1982 World Juniors Track Cycling Championships were the eighth annual Junior World Championships for track cycling held in Marsciano, Italy in August 1982.

The Championships had five events for men only: Sprint, Points race, Individual pursuit, Team pursuit and 1 kilometre time trial.

Events

Medal table

References

UCI Juniors Track World Championships
1982 in track cycling
August 1982 sports events in Europe